This is a list of the 237 cricketers who have represented Middlesex CCC in List A cricket since 1963.

Players are listed in strict alphabetical order

as of 16 August 2022

A

B

C

D

E

F

G

H

I

J

K

L

M

N

O

P

R

S

T

U

V

W

Y

References 
 List of Middlesex CCC first-class cricketers
 List of Middlesex CCC Twenty20 cricketers

External links 
 Cricinfo
 Cricket Archive

List A limited-overs cricketers
Middlesex
Middlesex cricketers